In general, an assistance dog, known as a service dog in the United States, is a dog trained to aid or assist an individual with a disability. Many are trained by an assistance dog organization, or by their handler, often with the help of a professional trainer.

Service dogs are to not be confused with Emotional Support Animals, as Emotional Support Animals are not protected under the ADA laws and typically have little to no training in comparison to a service dog

Terminology
'Assistance dog' is the internationally established term for a dog that provides assistance to a disabled person, and is task-trained to help mitigate the handler's disability. Assistance Dogs International, an international network of assistance dog providers across the globe, notes that there is some variability of terminology in different states, particularly within the United States. They are working to establish consistent global terminology, and note that 'assistance dog' is the term adopted by organizations who train and provide assistance dogs, and the disabled people who partner with assistance dogs.

Distinctive features

For a dog to be considered  an assistance dog, they must meet the following criteria:

 The dog's partner must be disabled and meet the legal definition of disability in the specific country or region.
 The dog must be specifically trained to mitigate the partner's disability in some way, e.g. opening doors, detecting high blood sugar or allergens and notifying of such, alerting to a ringing phone, leading those who are visually or mobility impaired.
 The dog must be trained to a high level not to be a nuisance in public, to be safe with members of the public and well-behaved, as well as being healthy and not posing a hygiene threat.
 Some assistance dogs wear harnesses that signify such in bold letters, but this is not required by law.
 Assistance dogs in America are not required by the ADA law to have an ID card or be registered.
Individual countries and regions will have specific laws and regulations, with these international criteria having broad recognition across the globe.

Training process 

Assistance dogs have traditionally been trained by charities and other organizations who then partner a disabled person with a trained dog when the dog has completed its training program at approximately the age of 2. Increasingly, more disabled people are self-training their own assistance dogs, whereby the disabled person selects their own dog (often referred to as a 'prospect') and the dog is trained by the disabled person who also becomes their eventual handler. 
There is great variability between the length and type of training that any future assistance dog receives; however, all assistance dog candidates will go through certain stages.

Selection
Assistance dog candidates are generally selected with care for appropriate health, temperament and characteristics. Large established organizations such as The Guide Dogs for the Blind select and maintain their own breeding stock to ensure healthy pups with desirable traits. Someone may carefully select prospect puppies from reputable breeders, or they may choose to commence training with a dog who was already part of the family. The reality TV show Rescue Dog to Super Dog featured the process of carefully selecting rescue dogs from shelters to train as assistance dogs.

Socialization
The first period of a puppy prospect's life is normally spent in socialization rather than formal training. Large formal organizations often use puppy foster parents during the pups first year and the pup grows up in a normal family environment surrounded by the sights, sounds and smells of the type of environment they will later work in, learning to be clean and toilet trained, confident and happy. Owner Trainers raise their pups themselves, so the dog lives with the same person who will later be their handler, but will also focus on giving the puppy confidence, play experiences and socialisation in the environments they will later work in.

Task training 
Once a puppy is old enough they will commence their specialist training which will include training in work and/or tasks. It is these tasks which will make them distinct and specialised assistance dogs. In the US, an assistance dog handler may be asked if they have a disability, and what tasks the dog does to mitigate that disability as the only two legal questions to ascertain that a dog is indeed an assistance dog. The tasks that an assistance dog prospect will learn depend on the disabilities that their current or future handler has and there is therefore almost no limit on the types of tasks a dog can be trained to. These may vary from picking up dropped items and taking laundry out of a washing machine to interrupting self-harming behaviors to providing deep pressure therapy for an autistic person.

Obedience and public access 

At the same time as learning their unique tasks to support their handler, an assistance dog candidate also learns how to be well behaved, polite and to present acceptably in public. Large organizations who train assistance dogs  will use their own in house training processes. Owner trainers may also approach this in a variety of ways. Many owner-trainer support groups recommend following established dog obedience schemes such as the Kennel Club Bronze, Silver and Gold obedience training programme to gain a high and dependable recognized standard of obedience and behavior followed by the Public Access Test. Public Access tests evaluate a dog's ability to behave appropriately in public,and in places not normally deemed pet friendly where a person may enter with an assistance dog,such as a supermarket or restaurant.

Classification
In the United States, assistance dogs fall into two broad categories:  service dogs  and facility dogs. Service dogs are defined by the Americans with Disabilities Act as dogs that are individually trained to do work or perform tasks for people with disabilities. State and local governments, businesses, and nonprofit organizations that serve the public generally must allow service animals to accompany people with disabilities in all areas of the facility where the public is normally allowed to go. Facility dogs are used by working professionals to aid multiple people.

Common examples of assistance dogs include: 

 Guide dogs  assist the blind and the visually impaired.
 Hearing dogs, or signal dogs, help the deaf and hard of hearing.
 Mobility assistance dogs 
 Medical response dogs 
 Seizure response dogs
 Psychiatric service dogs 
 Autism Assistance dogs 
Common examples of facility dogs include:
 Courthouse facility dogs  are typically handled by professionals working in the legal system. They are often used to assist crime victims, witnesses, and others during the investigation and prosecution of crimes as well as other legal proceedings.
Facility dogs in educational settings are usually handled by special education teachers to facilitate interaction with the students.
 Facility dogs in healthcare environments are typically handled by physical therapists, psychologists, and other healthcare professionals to facilitate recovery and symptom management for patients.

Similarities and differences between facility dogs and therapy dogs

Because both may aid people in similar settings such as healthcare environments, facility dogs are often mistakenly called therapy dogs; however, there are several important distinctions between them. Facility dogs are trained by accredited assistance dog organizations and therapy dogs are trained by their owners. Facility dogs may be handled by a wide variety of working professionals, while therapy dogs must be handled by their owners.

Facility dogs are trained by canine professionals or by their owner for a period of 18 to 24 months, and must pass very rigorous tests before graduating from an assistance dog organization. In contrast, registration for therapy dogs by a therapy dog organization does not require enrollment in obedience classes or therapy dog classes, meaning that therapy dogs often undergo a much less rigorous training process. Furthermore, the tests that therapy dogs must pass are less complicated and challenging than those taken by facility dogs.

A person with either a therapy dog or a facility dog must have permission from the facilities they visit before they can enter with their animal. They do not have the right to demand access to places where pets are not generally permitted, or to have fees associated with their pets waived.

See also 

 
 
 
 
 Dogs for Good (in the UK)
 Hearing Dogs for Deaf People (in the UK)
 Hounds for Heroes

References

External links

Delta Society's National Service Animal Resource Center

 Assistance dog
Dog roles